Holy Week is a 1995 Polish drama film directed by Andrzej Wajda. It was entered into the 46th Berlin International Film Festival where it won the Silver Bear for outstanding artistic contribution.

Plot 
The film takes place in 1943 in occupied Warsaw. Irena Lilien, a young Jewish woman, hides with her friends. Taken by two Gestapo agents, she bribes them. On the street, she meets her ex-fiancé who takes her to his apartment. The presence of a Jewish woman gives rise to various attitudes among Poles living in the tenement house.

Cast

  Beata Fudalej as Irena Lilien
  as Jan Malecki
 Magdalena Warzecha as Anna Malecka
 Bożena Dykiel as Mrs. Piotrowska
 Cezary Pazura as Piotrowski
 Wojciech Pszoniak as Zamojski
 Agnieszka Kotulanka as Karska
 Artur Barciś as Zaleski
 Krzysztof Stroiński as Osipowicz
 Michal Pawlicki as Irena's Father
 Maria Seweryn as Marta
 Tomasz Preniasz-Strus as Wladek

References

External links

1995 films
1995 drama films
Polish drama films
1990s Polish-language films
Films directed by Andrzej Wajda
Silver Bear for outstanding artistic contribution